The 2021 Central American Men's Handball Championship took place in Tegucigalpa, Honduras from 11 to 13 November. It acted as a qualifying tournament for the 2022 South and Central American Men's Handball Championship.

Results

Round robin
All times are local (UTC−06:00).

References

External links
COSCABAL Official Website

Central American Handball Championship
Central American Men's Handball Championship
International sports competitions hosted by Honduras
Central American Handball Championship
Central American Handball Championship